The GT42CU ACe is a model of diesel electric locomotives manufactured by EDi Rail, Maryborough between 2007 and 2013 under licence from Electro-Motive Diesel, for use on narrow gauge railways in Queensland, South Australia and Western Australia.

History
The GT42CU ACe is an evolution of the GT42CU AC being fitted with a different computer system and traction motors.

In 2006, Queensland Rail placed an initial order for 15, with a further orders increasing the number to 75. These were designated as the 4100 class. Following Queensland Rail purchasing Australian Railroad Group in June 2006, 19 were transferred to Western Australia and reclassified as the ACN class, but retain their original numbers.

The Queensland based units are primarily used on the Blackwater, Moura and Newlands coal networks, and on phosphate trains between Mount Isa and Townsville. The Western Australian-based units are primarily engaged hauling iron ore trains. All were included in the transfer of Queensland Rail's freight business to QR National in July 2010.

Pacific National placed an order for 13 units for coal haulage on the Blackwater system that later grew to 46. These were designated as the 83 class.

In July 2012, One Rail Australia placed an order for five for use in South Australia. Designated the GWN class, they operated on the Arrium iron ore railway to Whyalla Steelworks. They were transferred to Queensland after being displaced by 5 Queensland Railways 2250 class locomotives returning to Australia from South Africa.

A further six were built as a speculative order for Locomotive Demand Power as the LDP class. One was painted in Pacific National livery and numbered 8347 in anticipation of a lease that failed to eventuate, the others were numbered LDP016-LDP020 with all six placed in store in Maryborough. All were included in the sale of Downer Rail's locomotive business to Progress Rail Services and in December 2017, were moved to Redbank Railway Workshops entering service as 8347–8352 with Pacific National in April and May 2018.

Fleet

Related Development
 UGL Rail C44aci
 Downer EDI Rail GT46C ACe
 Downer EDI Rail GT42CU AC

References

Aurizon diesel locomotives
Diesel locomotives of Queensland
Diesel locomotives of Western Australia
Pacific National diesel locomotives
Queensland Rail locomotives
Railway locomotives introduced in 2007
3 ft 6 in gauge locomotives of Australia
Diesel-electric locomotives of Australia